The Centre Page is a pub at 29–33 Knightrider Street, London EC4.

It is a Grade II listed building, built in the mid-19th century, and previously known as The Horn Tavern.

References

External links
 
 

Grade II listed pubs in the City of London